Swedish Dress Reform Association was a Swedish women's association, active from 1886 to 1903.  It was a part of the Victorian dress reform, and worked to reform women's dress toward a more healthy and comfortable style, including abolishing the corset.  The movement attracted a lot of attention and achieved some success during its duration, such as making corsets unfashionable among school girls.

History

Foundation
The views of the Victorian dress reform were made known in Sweden by the book Dress and Health, which was translated to Swedish under the name  (likely by Oscara von Sydow) with an introduction by Curt Wallis and Hanna Winge. In February 1885, Anne Charlotte Leffler held a speech on the subject in the women's club Nya Idun, and asked Hanna Winge to design a Swedish reform dress; when this was done, Leffler became the first woman in Sweden to wear a reform dress.

Among the members were Anna Hierta-Retzius and Ellen Key, who acted as its first, temporary chairperson upon its foundation, until a permanent one could be elected.

Activity
The society was active in changing public opinion toward a more healthy dress style for women by public lectures, articles and publications. It was given wide support by Scandinavian medical doctors, and Curt Wallis, Karolina Widerström and Lorentz Dietrichson all wrote supporting articles which denounced particularly tight lace corseting as unhealthy.  In 1889, Queen Sophia invited the chairperson to an official audience and invited her to display the reform dresses designed by Augusta Lundin at Ulriksdal Palace, and afterward gave the society her formal support, which was publicized as a great success.

Impact
While no separate dress reform society was established in the other Nordic nations of Denmark, Finland and Norway, the women's movement in these countries was influenced by the Swedish dress reform society and was also active in the issue. 

The reform dress of the society was manufactured by Friends of Handicraft and by the studio of Augusta Lundin, who dressed her gofers in the reform dress.  The reform dress in itself never managed to become popular, although a few radical women such as Calla Curman, Sonja Kovalevsky, Alfhild Agrell and Anna Boberg wore the reform dress in public.  However, the society did achieve some success in regard to the use of corsets on girls.  In the 1890s, it was reported that the use of corsets within Swedish girl' schools had diminished markedly, as it was no longer regarded proper for a school girl to wear a corset.

Dissolution
In 1890, the association became a part of the Fredrika Bremer Association.  It was considered a natural step for Swedish women's associations at the time to organize under the FBA, but it sorted as a separate entity under the FBA and continued to function independently.  After 1896, however, the progressively more simple and comfortable fashions, the introduction of sportswear during cycling and the decrease in tight-laced corsets made the activity of the society diminish. In 1903, it was dissolved.

Chairperson
 1886-1889: Kerstin Bohman
 1889-1892: Marie-Louise Berg
 1892-1896: Gurli Linder

See also
 Rational Dress Society
 National Dress Reform Association
 Artistic Dress movement

References

19th century in Sweden
1886 in Sweden
Feminist organizations in Sweden
1886 establishments in Sweden
1903 disestablishments in Sweden
1886  in women's history
19th-century fashion 
Clothing controversies 
History of clothing (Western fashion)